Lopid may refer to:
the Lopit people
the Lopit language
the cholesterol drug gemfibrozil